Attack of the Lederhosen Zombies is a 2016 Austrian comedy horror film directed by Dominik Hartl and based on a screenplay written by Hartl and Armin Prediger. The film had its world premiere on 4 April 2016 at the Brussels International Fantastic Film Festival and stars Laurie Calvert, Gabriela Marcinková, and Oscar Dyekjær Giese as three young people who must defend themselves against the undead on a snowy mountaintop.

Plot synopsis
Steve is an immature professional snowboarder that has just been stranded in the mountains with his girlfriend/manager Branka and Joschi, a fellow snowboarder, as a result of a prank he played during a publicity video for their sponsor. The trio manages to take shelter in a mountaintop hotel, only for things to grow increasingly more dire after they discover that the resort owner's experiment to make snow in warmer temperatures has turned the local wildlife and humans into bloodthirsty zombies.

Cast
 Laurie Calvert as Steve
 Gabriela Marcinková as Branka
 Oscar Dyekjær Giese as Josh
 Margarete Tiesel as Rita
 Karl Fischer as Franz
 Kari Rakkola as Chekov
 Martin Loos as Knaup
 Patricia Aulitzky as Hilde

Reception
The film holds a rating of 55% on Rotten Tomatoes, based on 11 reviews, and has an average rating of 5/10. 
The Guardian rated the movie at two out of five stars, writing that "The acting is wooden and the special effects aren’t all that special, but it’s a spirited effort and doesn’t drag during its 78 minutes." Empire magazine was slightly more positive, stating "Rising to the challenge of doing something new(ish) with an overworked subgenre, this may not be particularly scary or funny. But it belies its modest budget to splatter to knowing effect." SciFiNow espoused a similar view, commenting that it "at least tries to do something a bit different with a subgenre that long became saturated past the point of no return. It falls firmly into the ‘disposable fun’ category, but ultimately it isn't much more than that."

References

External links
 

2016 horror films
2016 comedy horror films
Austrian comedy horror films
Zombie comedy films
Skiing films
Films set in the Alps
2016 comedy films
Austrian zombie films